The following Union Army units and commanders fought in the Battle of Chantilly of the American Civil War. The Confederate order of battle is shown separately.

Abbreviations used

Military Rank
 MG = Major General
 BG = Brigadier General
 Col = Colonel
 Ltc = Lieutenant Colonel

Other
 k = killed

Army of Virginia

III Corps, Army of the Potomac

MG Samuel P. Heintzelman

IX Corps, Army of the Potomac
MG Jesse L. Reno

References
 Taylor, Paul. He Hath Loosed the Fateful Lightning: The Battle of Ox Hill (Chantilly), September 1, 1862. White Mane Books: Shippensburg, Pennsylvania, 2003. 
 Todd, William. The Seventy-Ninth Highlanders NY Volunteers in The War of The Rebellion 1861-1865, page 212. Press of Brandow, Barton and Co., Albany, N.Y., 1886.  Reprinted in 1997, Higginson Book Company, 148 Washington St., Salem, Massachusetts 01970

American Civil War orders of battle